The 1906 Vanderbilt Commodores football team represented Vanderbilt University during the 1906 Southern Intercollegiate Athletic Association football season. The team's head coach was Dan McGugin, who served his third season in that capacity. Members of the Southern Intercollegiate Athletic Association (SIAA), the Commodores played seven home games in Nashville, Tennessee at Curry Field, and finished the season with a record of 8–1 overall and 5–0 in SIAA.

The 1906 Vanderbilt team had one of the best seasons in the school's history, outscoring opponents 278–16. Innis Brown rated the 1906 team as the best the South ever had. Vanderbilt won all of its home games, finishing the season on a 23-game home win streak. Their only loss came on the road to western power Michigan, 10–4; the game had been tied until the closing minutes.

Seven of the Commodores' eight wins came by shutout – only two teams scored on them all season. Several teams failed to gain a single first down against the Commodores. The team most notably defeated northern power Carlisle by a single Bob Blake field goal 4–0. Back Owsley Manier was selected third-team All-America by Walter Camp, the South's first.

Before the season
Notable losses from the 1905 team included Bachelor of Ugliness Ed Hamilton, captain Innis Brown, and quarterback Frank Kyle.

Rule changes
At the end of 1905 football looked about to be abolished due to all of the reoccurring violence during games. Football was a sport that had degenerated into dangerous tactics such as: the flying wedge, punching, kicking, piling-on, and elbows to the face. Almost any violent behavior was allowed. Fatalities and injuries mounted during the 1905 season.

As a result, the 1906 season was played under a new set of rules. The rules governing intercollegiate football were changed to promote a more open and less dangerous style of play. An intercollegiate conference, which would become the forerunner of the NCAA, approved radical changes including  the legalization of the forward pass, allowing the punting team to recover an on-side kick as a live ball, abolishing the dangerous flying wedge, creating a neutral zone between offense and defense, and doubling the first-down distance to 10 yards, to be gained in three downs.

Schedule

Season summary

Week 1: Kentucky State

Sources:

In a 28–0 win over Kentucky State College to open the season, Owsley Manier scored three touchdowns and the Commodores as a whole rushed for 630 yards. G. A. Hall had a 33-yard punt return for a touchdown. The Commodores were penalized several times. Kentucky never had a first down and had to punt after second down.

The starting lineup was: Stone (left end); Pritchard (left tackle); King (left guard); Wynne (center); Sherrill (right guard); E. Noel (right tackle); B. Blake (right end); Costen (quarterback); Crawford (left halfback); Craig (right halfback); Manier (fullback).

Week 2: Mississippi

Sources:

Vanderbilt easily beat Mississippi 29–0. Like McGugin, Mississippi's coach Thomas S. Hammond was a Michigan alumnus. One account reads: "whatever hopes the spectators had of seeing a close and exciting football game today when Vanderbilt faced Mississippi were shattered in the very first five minutes of play." The stars of the contest were Dan Blake and Honus Craig. Mississippi failed to gain a single first down. Umpire Henry D. Phillips kicked Joe Pritchard out of the contest for roughing.

The starting lineup was: V. Blake (left end); E. Noel (left tackle); McLain (left guard); Stone (center); Chorn (right guard); Pritchard (right tackle); B. Blake (right end); Costen (quarterback); D. Blake (left halfback); Craig (right halfback); Manier (fullback).

Week 3: Alabama

Sources:

The only loss of the year for the Alabama Crimson Tide was its biggest ever loss to Vanderbilt, 78–0. Seven of Alabama's regular players were out with injuries. Vanderbilt executed several onside kicks from scrimmage. Owsley Manier scored five touchdowns  as: "the back field frequently went twenty-five or thirty yards over the line". Alabama was held to just a single first down. Due to injuries, Alabama had not wished to play, and: "the comparatively few who came to see them play were scarcely rewarded by seeing touchdowns made every two minutes."

The starting lineup was: V. Blake (left end); Pritchard (left tackle); McLain (left guard); Stone (center), Chorn (right guard); E. Noel (right tackle); B. Blake (right end); Costen (quarterback); D. Blake (left halfback); Craig (right halfback); Manier (fullback).

Week 4: Texas
Vanderbilt romped over the Texas Longhorns 45–0. Sam Costen had a run of 61 yards, Dan Blake one of 52, and Vaughn Blake 42. Two other touchdowns were had by Vanderbilt but referee Bradley Walker called the team back for holding. The Texas men seemed equal to Vanderbilt's in physique, yet they too failed to net a first down.

The starting lineup was: V. Blake (left end); Pritchard (left tackle); Chorn (left guard); Stone (center); McLain (right guard); E. Noel (right tackle); B. Blake (right end); Costen (quarterback); Craig (left halfback); D. Blake (right halfback); Manier (fullback).

Week 5: at Michigan

Sources:

On November 3, Vanderbilt lost to the Michigan Wolverines by a 10–4 score. The game remained tied at 4–4 until the closing minutes. The Masonic Theater in Nashville was crowded with those who had come to see the game detailed.

Before the game, Michigan coach Fielding Yost said: "I have said right along that the Vanderbilt team would come nearer beating us than any team ever did...In Craig, Blake, and Manier I think Vanderbilt has the three greatest backs of any one team in the country." On the night just before the game, 4,200 students attended a mass meeting at University Hall. McGugin and Yost both spoke to the crowd and agreed that the game would be one of the closest played in Ann Arbor in many years. D. G. Fite, father-in-law of both McGugin and Yost, traveled from his home in Tennessee to watch the game.

John Garrels put Michigan ahead with a field goal from the 25-yard line. On the preceding drive, Garrels had completed a 15-yard forward pass to Bishop, the first legal forward pass completed by Michigan under the new rules. Michigan led, 4–0, at halftime. Early in the second half, Vanderbilt tied the score with a field goal by Dan Blake from the 30-yard line. With two minutes left in the game, Garrels ran 68 yards for a touchdown.  The Chicago Daily Tribune wrote: "Garrels, on a fake kick, with splendid interference by Hammond, Curtis, and Workman, ran Vanderbilt's left end at lightning speed for sixty-eight yards and a touchdown." Curtis kicked the extra point, and Michigan led, 10–4.

The starting lineup was: V. Blake (left end); Pritchard (left tackle); Chorn (left guard); Stone (center); McLain (right guard); E. Noel (right tackle); B. Blake (right end); Costen (quarterback); Craig (left halfback); D. Blake (right halfback); Manier (fullback).

Week 6: Rose Polytechnic
The 33 to 0 win over Rose Polytechnic proved the surprise of the season. Owsley Manier again scored five touchdowns, but he also: "probably prevented the visitors from scoring by his clever defensive work." Bob Blake kicked four extra points and a 20-yard field goal from placement.

The starting lineup was: V. Blake (left end); Pritchard (left tackle); McLain (left guard); Stone (center); Chorn (right guard); E. Noel (right tackle); B. Blake (right end); Costen (quarterback); D. Blake (left halfback); Craig (right halfback); Manier (fullback).

Week 7: at Georgia Tech

Sources:

Vanderbilt defeated coach John Heisman, who had helped legalize the forward pass, and his Georgia Tech team in the rain and mud of Atlanta 37–6. Lobster Brown scored Tech's points. Atlanta Constitution sportswriter Alex Lynn wrote after the  game that Owsley Manier was: "the greatest fullback and all round man ever seen in Atlanta." He again scored five touchdowns.

The starting lineup was: V. Blake (left end); Pritchard (left tackle); McLain (left guard); Stone (center); Chorn (right guard); E. Noel (right tackle); B. Blake (right end); Costen (quarterback); D. Blake (left halfback); Craig (right halfback); Manier (fullback).

Week 8: Carlisle

Sources:

On Thanksgiving, the Commodores reached the season's high point and beat the Carlisle Indians 4–0. Just a week before the contest, Vanderbilt negotiated a game with Carlisle to fill an open date. The Nashville Banner predicted it would be: "the greatest game the south ever saw." The game started forty-five minutes late to accommodate the large crowd.

Vanderbilt won by a single, 17-yard Bob Blake field goal 4–0.  In the first two minutes of play, the Indians drove the ball to Vanderbilt's 3-yard line, but the Commodores line held and they got no further.
Frank Mount Pleasant, one of the first regular spiral pass quarterbacks, attempted four field goals, but missed them all.

Atlanta Constitution sporting editor A. W. Lynn wrote: "The general surprises are numerous enough, but the largest particular one was the Commodore–Indian contest, when Vanderbilt took off the greatest honors ever falling to the lot of a southern football team in the hardest battle ever fought on a southern gridiron. John Heisman wrote: "Manier bucked the Indians' line. Costen handled the ball surely and well downed Mt. Pleasant in his tracks on most of Blake's punts...I am still convinced that outside Yale and Princeton, the Commodores would have an even break with any other team in the country." Vanderbilt running back Honus Craig called this his hardest game, giving special praise to Albert Exendine as: "the fastest end I ever saw."

One source claims the Carlisle Indians failed to receive supplies on the trip to Nashville, including their receiving carboys emptied of water. "The Indians had the poorest kind of accommodations at Nashville, and on account of the change of water every one of them became ill."

The starting lineup was: V. Blake (left end); Pritchard (left tackle); McLain (left guard); Stone (center); Chorn (right guard); E. Noel (right tackle); B. Blake (right end); Costen (quarterback); D. Blake (left halfback); Craig (right halfback); Manier (fullback).

Week 9: Sewanee

Sources:

Despite Vanderbilt's strong record, the Sewanee Tigers were undefeated and felt cause for optimism in the effective Southern championship. One account recalls: "A high authority on foot-ball said the other day: Vanderbilt is not invincible, by a good deal. The Sewanee "Tigers" are going to Nashville on Thursday to prove that fact." Vanderbilt struggled, but still won 20–0. "With Vandy making only 20 points–Vandy was stale, was the explanation." After the big win over Carlisle, "a matter-of-course feeling pervaded the entire game." The first score of the game came on a 25-yard field goal. The first touchdown came from Owsley Manier. In the second half, Bob Blake made a 22-yard field goal, and Manier got another touchdown.

The starting lineup was: V. Blake (left end); Pritchard (left tackle); McLain (left guard); Stone (center); Chorn (right guard); E. Noel (right tackle); B. Blake (right end); Costen (quarter); D. Blake (left halfback); Craig (right halfback); Manier (fullback).

Post-season

Vanderbilt won an SIAA championship. Coach McGugin called the Carlisle victory "the crowning feat of the Southern Intercollegiate Athletic Association season."

Dan Blake, Owsley Manier, and Joe Pritchard all graduated. Manier went on to receive an M. D. from the University of Pennsylvania, and played one season on the football team.  "But his effectiveness at Pennsylvania was lessened by the attempt of the coaches to change his style of bucking a line from the low, plunging dive to running into it erect, knees drawn high and great dependence upon his companion backs to "hike" him." At Penn he was shifted to halfback, and mostly used for swift plunges into the line. Penn defeated Michigan, exacting revenge for the multiple losses suffered by Manier to Michigan at Vanderbilt.

Dan Blake went on to coach at Hopkinsville High School in Hopkinsville, Kentucky. While there he was manager of the electric light and gas plants of the Kentucky Public Service Company. Pritchard coached at LSU for part of one season and was later a Presbyterian dental missionary at Luebo in the Congo until he was forced to return to the United States due to poor health sometime before 1915.

Awards and honors
For some, Vanderbilt's eleven was the entire All-Southern team. Fullback Owsley Manier was selected third-team All-America by Walter Camp. This makes Manier the first Southern player to make any of Camp's teams.

Legacy
In 1911, Innis Brown rated the 1906 team as the best the South ever had. Sportswriter Joe Williams recalled "I suppose the first great Southern team was Vanderbilt of 1906."

Personnel

Depth chart
The following chart provides a visual depiction of Vanderbilt's lineup during the 1906 season with games started at the position reflected in parenthesis. The chart mimics a short punt formation while on offense, with the quarterback under center.

Varsity letter winners

Line

Backfield

Subs

Scoring leaders
In 1906, touchdowns were worth 5 points and field goals 4.

See also
 1906 College Football All-Southern Team
 1906 College Football All-America Team
 1906 Southern Intercollegiate Athletic Association football season

Notes

References

Bibliography
 
 

Vanderbilt
Vanderbilt Commodores football seasons
Vanderbilt Commodores football